Eryck Abecassis (born 1956) is a composer, musician and an electric guitar player. He composes and plays a wide range of music including orchestral to chamber music, electronic, theater, street theater, and cinema.

He moved to Paris in 1976 to study cinema and also worked as a photographer. In 1979 he decided to concentrate on music.

He started doing workshops on instrumental research at the IRCAM (Institute for music/acoustic research and coordination) in Paris (where he also did a computer music course).

He has been commissioned to compose music for Radio-France, Gmem, Ina-Grm, Grame, French government. His music has been played in international music festivals of "Présences", "Les Musiques-Marseille", "Musiques en scène-Lyon","Amplitude Festival Denmark","Computer Art Festival Padova" and some others.

As an electronic musician he travels in many countries including Spain, Brazil, Germany, Austria, England, Sweden, South Korea, and Italy. His style ranges between contemporary and electronic "noise music", with extensive use of the computer.

He has composed scores for film and documentaries, like Hava Aney Dey directed by Partho Sen-Gupta.

Works

Stage
Saved (incidental music, play by Edward Bond), 1984 
Les carnets de Junko, 5 comedians, cello, marimba, 1989 
Rois de cœur (dance music, choreography by Dominique Petit), 1991 
Bâtisseurs (incidental music), soprano, tenor, 1992 
récif (street theatre show), 1998; 
Cosmogonia (spectacle), 1998; 
La cage (pocket opera, libretto by Christophe Tarkos), mezzo-soprano, comedian, any 6 players, 1999 (collaboration with Thierry Aué); 
Passages (spectacle), 2002; 
Tempête (street theatre show), 2003; 
Le monde à l'envers (street theatre show), 2005

Orchestral
Kammerzirkus, small orchestra (17 players), 1996

Electroacoustic
Mondes dérangés, 8-track tape, 2003

Multimedia
Poupées-fantômes, piano, percussion, computer, film, 2004

References
Radio France page, accessed 4 February 2010 
Théâtre de Satrouville page on Abecassis's Le Voyage de Penazar, accessed 4 February 2010

External links 
 Official website, accessed 4 February 2010

1956 births
Living people
Musicians from Algiers
Algerian Jews
Algerian composers
French people of Algerian-Jewish descent